André Vaillant (November 3, 1890 – April 23, 1977), was a French linguist, philologist and grammarian who also specialized in Slavic languages.

He was born in Soissons. After studying at École Normale Supérieure in Paris, he became professor at the Collège de France, acting as a Chair of Slavic Languages and Literatures in 1952.

In Russia, he studied manuscripts written in Old Church Slavonic. He worked at the Institute of Slavic Studies of Paris. He collaborated in the drafting of the Journal of Slavic Studies which served as the basis for the development of his comparative grammar of Slavic languages .

He wrote twenty books including the six-volume Comparative Grammar of Slavic languages (Grammaire comparée des langues slaves), the two-volume Handbook of Old Church Slavonic (Manuel de vieux-slave) and a grammar of Serbo-Croatian together with Antoine Meillet.

He translated and published many liturgical texts written in Church Slavonic.

He died in Paris.

Bibliography
 Histoire et philologie. Langues et littératures slaves du Moyen Âge / André Vaillant / Paris : EPHE École Pratique des Hautes Études - 1965
 Histoire et philologie. Langues et littératures slaves du Moyen Âge / André Vaillant / Paris : EPHE École Pratique des Hautes Études - 1969
 Pascal Pierre et Johannet José, André Vaillant (1890-1977), l’homme et le savant, Revue des études slaves, t. 53, 1981, fasc. 3, p. 367-370.
 Les "Piesni razlike" de Dominko Zlatarié, thèse complémentaire pour le doctorat ès lettres présentée à la Faculté des lettres de l'Université de Paris, par André Vaillant.
 Grammaire comparée des langues slaves. Tome I, Phonétique. Lyon, I.A.C., 1950.
 Grammaire comparée des langues slaves. Tome II, Morphologie. Première partie, Flexion nominale. Lyon : I.A.C, 1958.
 Grammaire comparée des langues slaves. Tome II, Morphologie. Deuxième partie, Flexion pronominale. Lyon : I.A.C, 1958.
 Grammaire comparée des langues slaves. Tome III, Le verbe. Paris : Klincksieck, 1966.
 Grammaire comparée des langues slaves. Tome IV, La Formation des noms. Paris : Klincksieck, 1974.
 Grammaire comparée des langues slaves. Tome V, La syntaxe. Paris : Klincksieck, 1977

References

Sources
Tributes André Vaillant on the Persée website
Selected bibliography of André Vaillant
André Vaillant at the Slavic Studies Center at the University of Paris-Sorbonne

20th-century linguists
French philologists
Linguists from France
Slavists
1890 births
1977 deaths
20th-century philologists
Foreign members of the Serbian Academy of Sciences and Arts